A statue of the Confederate naval officer Raphael Semmes was displayed in Mobile, Alabama, since June 1900. It was removed on 5 June 2020 during the George Floyd protests, and was Relocated to the History Museum of Mobile. 

The city's mayor, Sandy Stimpson, stated that "Moving this statue will not change the past. It is about removing a potential distraction so we may focus clearly on the future of our city". Alabama Attorney General Steve Marshall subsequently threatened to prosecute the city, levying a $25,000 fine for removing the statue, if the removal becomes permanent.

See also
 List of monuments and memorials removed during the George Floyd protests

References

External links

 

2020 disestablishments in Alabama
Monuments and memorials in the United States removed during the George Floyd protests
Buildings and structures in Mobile, Alabama
Monuments and memorials in Alabama
Relocated buildings and structures in Alabama
Removed Confederate States of America monuments and memorials
Sculptures of men in Alabama
Statues in Alabama
Statues removed in 2020